Stella Waitzkin (1920–2003) was an American installation artist known for sculptural representation of books.

Biography
Waitzkin was born New York City in 1920. She studied with the abstract expressionists Hans Hofmann and Willem de Kooning. She was the recipient of nine MacDowell fellowships from 1974 through 1984. She was a member of the Women Artists in Revolution, and a member of Art Worker's Coalition during the 1970s. She died in 2003 in New York City. Prior to her death she agreed to the formation of the Waitzkin Memorial Library Trust which then distributed her works to over sixty museums.

Her work is in the permanent collection of the Corcoran Gallery of Art, the Museum of Modern Art, the Walker Art Center as well as the National Gallery of Art, the Smithsonian American Art Museum, the University at Albany, and the Gregg Museum of Art & Design.

A significant collection of her works was obtained by the John Michael Kohler Arts Center including three sculptural walls based on Waitzkin's Hotel Chelsea living room.

Works
Waitzkin focused on the objecthood of books as works of art, much like ancient scrolls and illuminated manuscripts. Starting in the mid-1960s, she started to make hundreds of sculptures in cast polyester resin, molded in the form of books. The John Michael Kohler Arts Center in Sheboygan, Wisconsin holds over 700 individual pieces of Stella Waitzkin's works. 

“Words are lies. I make the books to get away from the word. When I make the books, I feel like I’m telling folk stories; it’s all there inside the book. You don’t have to necessarily read it, see, because you already know the whole thing by heart.” Artist’s statement on Metamorphosis I.

References

External links
 listing of awards and exhibits at ArtNet

2003 deaths
1920 births
American women painters
20th-century American women artists
21st-century American women